The 1999 Waldbaum's Hamlet Cup was a men's tennis tournament played on Hard courts in Long Island, United that was part of the International Series of the 1998 ATP Tour. It was the nineteenth edition of the tournament and was held from 23–29 August 1999.

Seeds
Champion seeds are indicated in bold text while text in italics indicates the round in which those seeds were eliminated.

Draw

Finals

References

Doubles
Connecticut Open (tennis)
1999 Waldbaum's Hamlet Cup